Mihai Bendeac (born 16 February 1983) is a Romanian actor, comedian, parodist and TV show host, best known for the shows La Bloc, Băieți De Oraș, În Puii Mei, Românii au artiști, Teatru TV, iComedy, Jurnalul unui burlac and Mondenii. He returned to jury the show România Dansează in 2016, in season 3, after having missed season 2 and will jury alongside Monica Petrică and Mihai Petre, with whom he collaborated in the play In Puii Mei . Mihai Bendeac wrote the poem Nu mai aștept.

References

External links

Living people
Year of birth missing (living people)